Nama hispidum is an annual flowering plant.  Common names include sand bells, rough nama, and bristly nama.

Sand bells grow in the American desert southwest.

Similar species
 Nama demissum purple mat

References

External links
 Nama hispidum - Bristly Nama (Sandbells) - Wildflowers of Tucson, Arizona

hispidum
Flora of the California desert regions
Flora of the Sonoran Deserts
North American desert flora
Flora of the Southwestern United States
Flora without expected TNC conservation status